Mount Arrowsmith Biosphere Region (MABR) is a UNESCO Biosphere Reserve located on the east coast of Vancouver Island in British Columbia, Canada. It was designated in 2000 by UNESCO to protect a large second-growth coast Douglas fir ecosystem in the watersheds of the Little Qualicum and Englishman Rivers from being developed.

History

Early history
The watersheds of the Little Qualicum and Englishman Rivers on the northeastern slope of Mount Arrowsmith were once home to a large old-growth forest dominated by coast Douglas fir. The forest was clearcut in the early 1900s but eventually rebounded as the trees matured. In the mid-1990s, local logging industries pressured the provincial government to permit clearcutting in the area as the trees neared their harvestable size. Local conservation groups protested additional logging of the recovering forest.

Establishment
In 2000, UNESCO, in cooperation with local conservation groups and the provincial government, designated the land in these watersheds a UNESCO Biosphere Reserve, protecting the forest from being clearcut.

In November 2008, the governing body of Alberni-Clayoquot Regional District in cooperation with local conservation groups established Mount Arrowsmith Massif Regional Park within the biosphere reserve to further protecting the forest from being clearcut.

Restructuring
In 2013, members of the Mount Arrowsmith Biosphere Foundation voted to dissolve the society and transfer management of the biosphere reserve to Vancouver Island University (VIU) and the City of Parksville.

In 2014, VIU established the Mount Arrowsmith Biosphere Region Research Institute, which is governed by representatives from the Qualicum First Nation, Snaw-naw-as First Nation, City of Parksville, Town of Qualicum Beach, Regional District of Nanaimo, BC Ministry of Environment and Climate Change Strategy, Vancouver Island Conservation Land Management Program, Island Timberlands, TimberWest, and VIU.

Protected areas

Protected areas located within the biosphere reserve include:

Arbutus Grove Provincial Park
Englishman River Regional Park
Englishman River Falls Provincial Park
Little Qualicum Falls Provincial Park
MacMillan Provincial Park
Mount Arrowsmith Massif Regional Park
Qualicum National Wildlife Area
Rathtrevor Beach Provincial Park
Spider Lake Provincial Park

See also
Clayoquot Sound Biosphere Reserve
List of UNESCO Biosphere Reserves in Canada

References

External links

Biosphere reserves of Canada
Protected areas of British Columbia